Dichocrocis strigimarginalis is a moth in the family Crambidae. It is found in Brazil (Amazon region).

References

Moths described in 1899
Spilomelinae